Antonio Djakovic (born 8 October 2002) is a Swiss freestyle swimmer. He competed in the men's 400 metre freestyle at the 2019 World Aquatics Championships.
He also won a silver medal at the 2022 European aquatics championships in the 200 metres freestyle.

References

External links
 

2002 births
Living people
Swimmers at the 2018 Summer Youth Olympics
Swiss male freestyle swimmers
Swimmers at the 2020 Summer Olympics
Olympic swimmers of Switzerland
Medalists at the FINA World Swimming Championships (25 m)
Sportspeople from Thurgau
21st-century Swiss people
European Aquatics Championships medalists in swimming